Methyl hexanoate is the fatty acid methyl ester of hexanoic acid (caproic acid), a colourless liquid organic compound with the chemical formula . It is found naturally in many foods and has a role as a plant metabolite. It can also be found in the cytoplasm of cells.

Methyl hexanoate is produced industrially for use as a flavouring agent. It can also be used as fragrance for a pineapple smell.

Production 
Methyl hexanoate is produced in multi-tonne quantities for use as a flavouring agent. It is made by combining methanol with hexanoic acid . Naturally, plants metabolize a chemical to methyl hexanoate.

Uses 
Methyl hexanoate is found naturally in foods like potatoes, tomatoes and cheese and is a constituent of some alcoholic beverages. It can be used to mimic the flavor of pineapple like its related ester ethyl hexanoate.

Safety 
The  for rats is more than 5 g/kg, indicating low toxicity. When heated to decomposition, methyl hexanoate emits toxic fumes. It can cause burns.

Flammability
Methyl hexanoate is flammable.

See also
 Ethyl hexanoate
 Propyl hexanoate

References 

Methyl esters